Aris Jerome was born and raised in the Bay Area Fremont, CA. Inspired by the Bay Area music scene he started collaborating with the local music artists and created hundreds of underground music videos. This eventually moved him to Los Angeles by age 20.

Career 
Aris Jerome got his start by filming music videos for artists in the Bay Area scene such as E-40, The Jacka, Lil B, Mistah FAB, Kreayshawn, and more. His uprising eventually moved him down to Southern California. In Los Angeles he began shooting videos for artists Ty Dolla Sign, Talib Kweli, Omarion, and others. His music connections ended up sparking his photography career simultaneously. In 2014 - 2015 Aris Jerome photographed Hollywood Starlet's familiar faces, from the likes of Selena Gomez to Zendaya Coleman.

In 2017 Aris Jerome held his first photo exhibition titled MOODS.

Exhibitions 
 MOODS exhibition 2017, Los Angeles

Videography 
 DEV - Parade
 Kalin and Myles - Broken Hearted
 Iamsu! - Hipster Girls

References 

Living people
1989 births